Phebalium clavatum is a species of shrub that is endemic to Western Australia and is more or less covered with silvery scales. It has warty branchlets, more or less circular leaves with a large spherical gland and white flowers arranged singly on the ends of branchlets.

Description
Its branchlets are covered with pale red glands and silvery, scale-like hairs. The leaves and petiole are covered with silvery scales and the leaf has a large spherical gland. Flowering occurs from August to September.

Taxonomy and naming
Phebalium clavatum was first formally described in 1943 by Charles Gardner in the journal Journal of the Royal Society of Western Australia from specimens he collected near Widgiemooltha.

Distribution and habitat
This phebalium grows on sandplains in the Coolgardie district of Western Australia.

Conservation status
This phebalium is classified as "Priority Two" by the Western Australian Government Department of Parks and Wildlife, meaning that it is poorly known and from only one or a few locations.

References

clavatum
Flora of Western Australia
Plants described in 1970
Taxa named by Charles Gardner